Praepusa is an extinct genus of earless seals from Neogene marine deposits in Europe. Five species, P. boeska, P. magyaricus, P. pannonica, P. tarchankutica and P. vindoboensis, are known.

Description 
Praepusa's occipital bones possess well-developed jugular processes. The canine teeth are developed, and the molars are predominantly tricuspid in form, and, like the premolars, are packed closely together. The mandible as a whole is small and thin, with a symphyseal portion that is bluntly rounded, and the chin is most prominent between premolars 3–4. The facial part of the skull is relatively low and shortened, and the mandible is more compact. The deltoid crest of the humerus is sharp, with maximal distention at its proximal end. The trochanteric fossa of the femur is wide and medially open, though deep.

Taxonomy
There are five recognized species of Praepusa. P. boeska, known from Pliocene deposits in the Netherlands, is notable for being the smallest fossil seal, with a size comparable to the smallest extant seals of the genus Pusa. The other species include P. magyaricus, found in Serravallian-age deposits in Hungary, P. pannonica, known from Miocene marine deposits in the eastern Paratethys, P. tarchankutica, known from the Miocene of Ukraine, and P. vindobonensis, known from Miocene marine deposits in central and eastern Europe.

References

Miocene pinnipeds
Phocines
Prehistoric carnivoran genera
Prehistoric pinnipeds of Europe
Miocene mammals of Europe
Fossil taxa described in 1941